John M. Cabello served as a Republican member of the Illinois House of Representatives from August 2012 until 2021. In the 2022 general election, he was elected to the newly drawn Illinois 90th District.  after winning the Republican primary.

He previously represented the 68th district, which includes all or parts of Rockford, Machesney Park, Loves Park and Cherry Valley. Prior to his appointment, he was a member of the Winnebago County Board and the Harlem Township Board. After being reelected three times, he lost his 2020 reelection bid by 239 votes to Democratic candidate David Vella.

During the 2016 U.S. presidential election, Cabello was a co-chair of the Illinois Trump Victory Committee, supporting Republican candidate Donald Trump.

During the COVID-19 pandemic, John Cabello wrote an Illinois must fight releasing prisoners during the COVID-19 pandemic arguing that prisoners "...who are elderly and medically vulnerable, and those with pathways to release" should not be rehoused into empty hotel rooms for isolation purposes and called on the Governor to fight a civil rights lawsuit related to this all the way to the Supreme Court.

References

External links
Representative John M. Cabello (R) at the Illinois General Assembly
By session: 98th, 97th
State Representative John Cabello constituency site
John Cabello for State Representative
 
2012 Editorial Board Questionnaire at the Chicago Tribune

Living people
Republican Party members of the Illinois House of Representatives
People from Winnebago County, Illinois
Year of birth missing (living people)
21st-century American politicians
County board members in Illinois
Latino conservatism in the United States